Carpelimus is a genus of spiny-legged rove beetles in the family Staphylinidae. There are at least 100 described species in Carpelimus.

See also
 List of Carpelimus species

References

Further reading

 
 
 
 
 
 
 
 

Oxytelinae